Kouider Boukessassa (born May 30, 1974) is an Algerian former football player who especially played as a forward for MC Oran in the Algerian Championnat National.

Honours

Clubs
MC Oran
 Runner-up of the Algerian League in 1997 and 2000
 Runner-up of the Algerian Cup in 1998 and 2000
 Runner-up of the Algerian League Cup in 2000
 Won the Arab Cup Winners' Cup in 1997 and 1998
 Won the Arab Super Cup in 1999
CR Belouizdad
 Won the Algerian League in 2001
JSM Béjaïa
 Won the Algerian Cup in 2008
 Runner-up of the North African Cup Winners Cup in 2009

Personal
 Best player in the Arab Super Cup in 1999
 Best goalscorer in the Arab Super Cup in 1999

National team statistics

References

External links

1974 births
Algerian footballers
Algeria international footballers
Living people
Footballers from Oran
MC Oran players
JSM Béjaïa players
CR Belouizdad players
RCG Oran players
Association football forwards
21st-century Algerian people